Paura in città (internationally titled Fear in the City, Street War and Hot Stuff) is a 1976 Italian poliziottesco action film directed by Giuseppe Rosati.

Cast 
Maurizio Merli as Commissioner Mario Murri
James Mason as Quaestor
Raymond Pellegrin as Lettieri
Silvia Dionisio as Laura Masoni
Cyril Cusack as Giacomo Masoni
Fausto Tozzi as Maresciallo Esposito
Franco Ressel as Lo Cascio

See also    
 List of Italian films of 1976

References

External links

1976 films
1970s Italian-language films
English-language Italian films
1970s English-language films
Poliziotteschi films
Films directed by Giuseppe Rosati
1970s Italian films